Wonder in the World is the debut solo album by American Broadway artist Kelli O'Hara, and it was released by Ghostlight Records on May 6, 2008. The music is arranged and orchestrated by Harry Connick, Jr.

The album was originally recorded for Sony in 2006, a couple of days after the closing date for the musical The Pajama Game on Broadway, where O'Hara and Connick had the leads. Harry Connick, Jr plays piano on 12 of the album's 14 tracks.

The album's first track is written by O'Hara's husband Greg Naughton. Harry Connick, Jr. has written three of the tracks, and sings a duet with O'Hara on the title track "Wonder in the World".

The song "Fable", is the closing number from Adam Guettel's Light in the Piazza.

Wonder In the World appeared on Billboard's Jazz chart shortly after its release in May, 2008, and peaked at the number 12 position.

Track listing

References

External links
 KelliOHara.com—official site
Ghostlight Records

2008 debut albums